Phase curve may refer to:

Phase curve (astronomy) is the brightness of a reflecting body as a function of its phase angle.
Phase response curve is the relationship between the timing and the effect of a treatment designed to affect circadian rhythms.
Phase diagram is a type of chart used to show conditions at which thermodynamically distinct phases can occur at equilibrium.
Phase angle (astronomy) is the angle between the light incident onto an observed object and the light reflected from the object.
Phase line (mathematics) is a diagram that shows the behaviour of an autonomous ordinary differential equation